Rudi Kappel Airstrip  is located  south of the Tafelberg tepui in Suriname. It was constructed as part of Operation Grasshopper. It used to be named Tafelberg Airstrip, but was renamed Rudi Kappel Airstrip, after the co-pilot of a flight that crashed near Vincent Fayks Airport on 6 October 1959.

History
The airstrip was the first airstrip to be constructed in the interior of Suriname. On 3 March 1958, the  expedition to the Tafelberg began. One of the goals of the expedition was to examine whether an airstrip could be built on the savanna. On 16 March, Rudi Kappel, H. Massink, and 18 Amerindians started clearing the area, and on 24 March, the first plane landed on the airstrip.  In February 1959, Operation Grasshopper was announced which intended to map the natural resources in the interior of Suriname. As part of the operation, six more airstrips were to be constructed.

Charters and destinations 
Charter Airlines serving this airport are:

Accidents and incidents
 On 25 October 1968 a Douglas C-47A PH-DAA of KLM Aerocarto flew into Tafelberg following an engine failure whilst on a survey flight. The aircraft collided with the mountain in cloud, killing three of the five people on board.

See also

List of airports in Suriname
Transport in Suriname

References

External links
Aerial photo Tafelberg runway
Tafelberg Savannah Resort Mountain tours
Rudi Kappel Airport
OurAirports - Rudi Kappel

Airports in Suriname
Sipaliwini District